Horst-Tanu Margraf (26 October 1903 − 1978) was a German conductor, Generalmusikdirektor of Halle (Saale) from 1950 to 1969.

Margraf was music director in Lemberg during World War II. In Halle he was one of the founders of the Handel Festival. He conducted the Staatskapelle Halle in several operas of George Frideric Handel, some in their first modern production, such as Rinaldo in 1954. He conducted for the festival Radamisto (1955), Poro (1956), Admetos (1958), Giulio Cesare (1959) and Imeneo (1960).

"Generalmusic director" of Halle (Handel's hometown), he created a wonderful monument to his great compatriot - this is an excellent quality recording of 12 Сoncerti grossi op.6, made in 1960.

In 1966 he conducted a recording of a shortened version of Imeneo with Günther Leib in the title role,  Hans-Joachim Rotzsch as Tirinto, and Sylvia Geszty as Rosmene.

References

German male conductors (music)
1903 births
1978 deaths
20th-century German conductors (music)
20th-century German male musicians